Space & Time is an extended play by the American electronic rock project Celldweller. It is mostly a compilation of various songs from Wish Upon a Blackstar that have been remixed by Varien, KJ Sawka, Tim Ismag, and Klayton himself. It was released on December 11, 2012. Tim Ismag's remix of "Tough Guy" and KJ Sawka's remix of "Gift for You" were later released as free downloads.

Track listing

References 

Celldweller albums
2012 EPs